Herald Examiner or Herald-Examiner may refer to the following newspapers:

Chicago Herald-Examiner
Los Angeles Herald-Examiner